Nurudeen Oladapo Alao is a Nigerian professor of geography, educational administrator and former vice chancellor of the University of Lagos.

Biography
He obtained his first degree, a Bachelor of Arts from the University of Ibadan, Ibadan, Oyo State Nigeria. He earned a Master of Arts  and Doctor of philosophy degree from Northwestern University.

He was appointed vice chancellor of the University of Lagos in 1988 after the tenure of  professor Akinpelu Oludele Adesola. He was succeeded by professor Jelili Adebisi Omotola in 1995.

See also
Jelili Adebisi Omotola
List of vice chancellors in Nigeria

References

Nigerian educational theorists
Living people
University of Ibadan alumni
Vice-Chancellors of the University of Lagos
Northwestern University alumni
Academic staff of the University of Lagos
Year of birth missing (living people)